The Mississauga Eagles P.S.C. were a soccer team that operated in the Canadian Professional Soccer League for only one season. The club came into existence in 1998, and become a founding member of the inaugural CPSL. The franchise achieved little success in the league, and failed to qualify for postseason. At the start of the 1999 CPSL season the club folded, and were replaced by the Oshawa Flames.

History
In 1998, the Mississauga Eagles P.S.C. were founded and became an original member of the newly formed Canadian Professional Soccer League. Their home venue would become Wildwood Park located in Malton, Mississauga. The Mississauga franchise was owned and coached by Josef Komlodi, a former professional player in Hungary, and Germany. Notable players signed by the team were Hungarian import Attila Kovacs, and Vladimir Koval, a veteran from the Canadian National Soccer League. The club debuted on May 31, 1998 in a match against the York Region Shooters, and were defeated by a score of 3-1. Throughout the entire season Mississauga achieved little success within the league, and finished in a tie for seventh place with 10 points. One controversial event occurred on July 26, 1998 in a match against North York Astros, where Mississauga protested the match due to a dispute with team owner Komlodi and North York owner Bruno Ierullo about North York using a reserve team which operated in the Peel-Halton Regional Soccer League which violated Mississauga's territorial rights as the league operated within the boundaries of Mississauga's territory. The outcome of the event resulted in a forfeit for the Eagles, and a 2-0 victory for the Astros.  After a disappointing last place finish, in January 1999, the Eagles decided to fold.

1998 standings

References

Association football clubs established in 1998
Association football clubs disestablished in 1999
Canadian Soccer League (1998–present) teams
Defunct soccer clubs in Canada
Soccer clubs in Ontario
Sport in Mississauga
1998 establishments in Ontario
1999 disestablishments in Ontario